Howard Burton Lee (October 27, 1879 – May 24, 1985), of Mercer County, served as the Republican Attorney General of West Virginia from 1925 to 1933. His efforts to eliminate government corruption during that time helped to end the West Virginia Mine Wars.

Lee was born in Wirt County, West Virginia and graduated from Marshall College. He wrote a number of books including Bloodletting in Appalachia, The Story of the Constitution, The Criminal Trial in the Virginias, and The Burning Springs and Other Tales of the Little Kanawha. Lee died at the age of 105 at the Hobe Sound Geriatric Village nursing home in Stuart, Florida.

See also
List of attorneys general of West Virginia

References

1879 births
1985 deaths
American centenarians
Men centenarians
West Virginia Attorneys General
People from Mercer County, West Virginia
People from Wirt County, West Virginia
Marshall University alumni
Writers from West Virginia
Republican Party members of the West Virginia House of Delegates